Josephine Phelan (1905–1979), Canadian writer and librarian, won the Governor General's Award for English-language non-fiction in 1951 for The Ardent Exile, a biography of Thomas D'Arcy McGee.

Born in Hamilton, Phelan was educated in Guelph and at the University of Toronto where she earned a Master of History. After attending the Ontario College of Education, Phelan taught high school before moving to Montreal to work in publishing. In 1931, she returned to the University of Toronto and earned a degree in library science in 1931 and worked at the Toronto Public Library from 1932 to 1965.

Works
 The Ardent Exile: The Life and Times of Thos. Darcy McGee (1951)
 The Boy Who Ran Away: Great Stories of Canada (1954)
 The Bold Heart: The Story of Father Lacombe (1956)
 The Ballad of D'Arcy McGee: Rebel in Exile (1967)

References

External links
 Archives of Josephine Phelan (Josephine Phelan fonds, R11787) are held at Library and Archives Canada

1905 births
1979 deaths
Governor General's Award-winning non-fiction writers
20th-century Canadian women writers
20th-century Canadian non-fiction writers
Canadian librarians
Canadian women librarians
Canadian biographers
Canadian women non-fiction writers